Sausnēja Parish is an administrative unit of Madona Municipality in the Vidzeme region of Latvia. At the beginning of 2014, the population of the parish was 622. The administrative center is Sidrabiņi village.

Towns, villages and settlements of Sausnēja parish 
 Liepkalne
 Sausnēja
 Sidrabiņi

References 

Parishes of Latvia
Madona Municipality
Vidzeme